The Pokémon Trading Figure Game (Pokémon TFG) is a collectible miniatures game similar to HeroClix. It was designed by Pokémon USA and based on Satoshi Tajiri's Pokémon media franchise.

It was released in Australia in August 2006, followed by releases in Europe and Southeast Asia later that year and in the United States and Japan in 2007. On June 2, 2009, the Pokémon Trading Figure Game was confirmed to be discontinued.

Pokémon Duel, a free-to-play digital version of the Pokémon Trading Figure Game, was released for Android and iOS devices in April 2016.

Development

The Pokémon Trading Figure Game was designed by Tsunekaz Ishihara, a general producer for Pokémon and one of the designers of the trading card game, with Kouichi Ooyama and Mr. Masayuki Miura. They spent several years preparing the game's look and feel to ensure the best possible trading figure game. They aimed at maintaining the spirit of the Pokémon through all the properties, but realized there would be some differences. The figures are designed and created by Kaiyodo, with help from the game designers.

Gameplay
Players take turns moving their Pokémon around the playmat, attempting to get one of their Pokémon on the opponent's Goal. If their Pokémon stops next to an opposing Pokémon, they can choose to battle. In a battle, both players spin their own figures, and the best result wins. A single game can take place on the 3-on-3 playmat or the 6-on-6 playmat. The quick 3-on-3 version lets players explore the basic strategies of the game while the 6-on-6 playmat offers a wider variety of tactics. A player can spin a trainer figure, to use a boost card.

Next Quest set (International Release)
The "Next Quest" set is made up of 42 figures and 8 cards. These pieces are divided into four levels of rarity: white star (extremely rare), black star (rare), black diamond (uncommon) and black circle (common).
There are also two subsets: the pearl sub-set, which contains all the rare figures and are a pearly colour, and the crystal subset are see through and contains all the EXrare figures. A ref figure is also found in the 9-figure set it would appear it is not part of the nextquest set however as it has the promo symbol underneath.

Two starter sets are available for this collection, entitled "Flamethrower" and "Riptide". Each starter set contains four figures, as well as the following:
Double-sided play mat (for 3 vs 3 or 6 vs 6 figurine play).
3 trainer cards (Max Revive, X Attack, X Accuracy, or Switch).
A full-color poster of the 42 figurines in the Next Quest set, with checklist boxes for collectors.
A rule book.

There are also four different booster packs available; these do not have individual names but are identified by the four different images on each packaging: Pikachu, Charizard, Groudon, and Feraligatr.

Figures

Cards

Cards included in the release of the figure game in: English, Italian, French, German

Max Revive No. 1/8
X Accuracy No. 2/8
X Attack No. 3/8
Long Throw No. 4/8
Swap Spots No. 5/8
Switch No. 6/8
Full Heal No. 7/8
Scoop Up No. 8/8

Next Quest set (US release)
There are several differences between the International and US release.

Packaging
The US release offers two types of starter sets and three types of booster packs.  All retail packagings are made of printed cardboard and plastic clamshell.  The 1-figure booster pack has one visible figure-spot.  The 2-figure booster pack has one visible figure-spot, and one secret figure spot.  The 3-figure booster pack has two visible figure-spots, and one secret figure-spot.

The visible figure-spot in the 1-figure booster pack contains either Groudon, Kyogre, Pikachu, Absol, Torchic, or Mudkip.

The visible figure-spot in the 2-figure booster pack and one of the visible figure-spot in the 3-figure booster pack contain either Ho-Oh, Lugia, Eevee, Salamence, or Zangoose.  Scyther was later released as a visible figure in the Target-exclusive 3-figure booster pack.

The second visible figure-spot in the 3-figure booster pack originally contained the Pokémon Diamond and Pearl starters.  A Target-exclusive release of the 3-figure booster pack has the starters replaced by crystal variations of the other visible figures.

The secret figure-spots in the 2-figure and 3-figure booster packs contain one random non-promotional figure from the Next Quest set.  Red and Brendan trainer figures from the starter sets appear rarely in the secret figure-spot of the 3-figure booster packs.

Figure Distribution
The figures from the US release do not have figure rarity and rarity symbol.

Packaging Contents
The secret figure-spots from the US release booster packs always have one trainer card.  All figures from the US release are sold with the spinner base, and the color of the spinner base in the secret figure-spot matches the color of the base in the visible figure-spot of the same pack.

Figure Construction
Beedrill figure from the US release has an additional support rod connecting between the Beedrill figure and the figure base.

Groundbreakers set
"Groundbreakers" would have been the first expansion set for the Pokémon Trading Figure Game.  The expansion was to feature two starter sets, with one, "Skydive", seeing an early release in Wal-Mart stores in November 2008.  The other, "Whirlwind", also saw a retail release.  The full release of the set was delayed several times before the Pokémon Trading Figure Game was officially discontinued on June 2, 2009, leaving the set unreleased.

References

Trading Figure Game